Copacabana is a 2010 French comedy film directed by Marc Fitoussi and starring Isabelle Huppert.

Cast
 Isabelle Huppert as Babou
 Aure Atika as Lydie
 Lolita Chammah as Esméralda
 Guillaume Gouix as Kurt
 Noémie Lvovsky as Suzanne
 Luis Rego as Patrice

See also
 Isabelle Huppert on screen and stage

References

External links

2010 films
2010s French-language films
2010 comedy films
Films directed by Marc Fitoussi
Films set in Belgium
French comedy films
2010s French films